Sister Mine is a 2007 novel by the American writer Tawni O’Dell.

Plot introduction
In the coal-mining country of Western Pennsylvania outside of Pittsburgh, the fictional locale of Jolly Mount is home to Shae-Lynn Penrose. Two years ago, five of her miner friends were catapulted to media stardom when they were rescued after surviving four days trapped in a mine. As the men struggle to come to terms with their ordeal, along with the fallout of their short-lived celebrity, Shae-Lynn finds herself facing her relationship with her brutal father, her conflicted passion for one of the miners, and the hidden identity of the man who fathered her son.

Plot summary
Shae-Lynn Penrose drives a cab in a town where no one needs a cab—but plenty of people need rides. A former police officer with a closet full of miniskirts, a recklessly sharp tongue, and a tendency to deal with men by either beating them up or taking them to bed, she has spent years carving out a life for herself and her son in Jolly Mount, Pennsylvania, the coal-mining town where she grew up.

When the younger sister Shae-Lyn thought was dead arrives on her doorstep followed closely by a gun-wielding Russian gangster, a shady New York lawyer, and a desperate Connecticut housewife, Shae-Lynn is forced to grapple with the horrible truth she discovers about the life her sister's been living, and one ominous question: will her return result in a monstrous act of greed, or one of sacrifice?

External links
Author's website

2007 American novels

Novels set in Pennsylvania